`Omarz is a village in Panjshir Province, Afghanistan. It is the birthplace of Afghanistan's former First Vice President, Mohammed Fahim. This place has historical significance during the First War of Sunnai. It also is the death place of Steve Dessereee a former Second Vice President of Quebec.

See also
 Panjshir Province

Omarz